Aktuala were a pioneering band from Italy, formed in 1972.  The name comes from the Esperanto for "contemporary". 

Their music has been categorised as world music, progressive rock, psychedelic, or avant garde, or "sounding like that of the English group Third Ear Band".

They formed in 1972 in Milan by husband and wife team Walter and Laura Maioli who were collectors and performers of ancient and ethnic instruments. For a while the group lived together in a musical commune, "picking olives and playing music". They played unconventional venues including asylums and wharfs.

They signed with the Bla Bla label and released their debut, self-titled album in 1973. Two members, Lino Vaccina and Walter Maioli, left soon afterwards to pursue a collaboration with Trilok Gurtu. All three returned for their second album, La Terra, which was released in 1974. Following this, the band moved to Morocco to produce their third album, Tappeto Volante, in 1976. 

Many of the band members went on to other music ventures. Maioli went on to the Futuro Antico project, Cavallanti to the band Muzik Circus, Gurtu to world music.

Members
 Walter Maioli: oboe, flute, harmonica, ethnic and self-designed and made "ancient" woodwind and percussion instruments, studio treatments 1973 - 1976
 Daniele Cavallanti: Saxes 1973 - 1976
 Antonio Cerantola: Guitar 1973 - 1976
 Laura Maioli: percussioni 1973
 Lino Vaccina: percussioni 1973 - 1974
 Otto Corrado: saxes, flute 1974
 Attilio Zanchi:  guitar 1974
 Marjon Klok: harp 1974 - 1976
 Trilok Gurtu: percussion 1974 - 1976
 Kela Rangoni Macchiavelli: percussioni 1976
 Fabrizio Cassanoi: sitar 1976

Discography
Aktuala LP (Bla Bla, 1973)
La Terra (The Earth) LP (Bla Bla, 1974)
Tappeto Volante (Flying Carpet) LP (Bla Bla, 1976)

External links
Walter Maioli's Aktuala page
Soundohm artist's page for Aktuala
Page on Italianprog for Aktuala
Prog Archives page for Aktuala

[ Aktuala profile] on Allmusic

Italian progressive rock groups
Italian world music groups
Musical groups from Milan